This is a list of Gretna Football Club seasons from 1987 to 1988, when Gretna played in the English Northern League, to 2007–08, when the club was liquidated and resigned its membership of the Scottish Football League. The list details Gretna's record in major league and cup competitions, and the club's top league goal scorer of each season where available. Top scorers in bold were also the top scorers in Gretna's division that season. Records of local competitions are not included.

The club was founded in 1946. Gretna played in the English Northern League until it was elected to the Scottish Football League, replacing the defunct Airdrieonians in 2002. Gretna rapidly rose through the Scottish leagues in the mid-2000s, as benefactor Brooks Mileson provided funding for professional players. After Mileson withdrew his funding, the club entered administration during the 2007–08 season. After the administrator failed to find a buyer for the club, the club resigned from its membership of the Scottish Football League. The club was subsequently liquidated, with its fans forming the new club Gretna F.C. 2008.

Seasons

English football

Scottish football

Key

 P = Played
 W = Games won
 D = Games drawn
 L = Games lost
 F = Goals for
 A = Goals against
 Pts = Points
 Pos = Final position

 R1 = Round 1
 R2 = Round 2
 R3 = Round 3
 R4 = Round 4
 QF = Quarter-finals
 SF = Semi-finals
 F = Final

 NPL 1 = Northern Premier League First Division
 NFL 1 = Northern Football League First Division
 SPL = Scottish Premier League
 SFL 1 = Scottish First Division
 SFL 2 = Scottish Second Division
 SFL 3 = Scottish Third Division

References

Seasons
 
Gretna